Sir Henry Weedon (26 March 1859 – 26 March 1921) was an Australian politician.

He was born in Melbourne to builder Henry Weedon and Emily Emery. He worked as a painter and decorator, eventually becoming managing partner of a photography studio. Around 1870 he married Emily Ellard, with whom he had one son; he would later marry Frances (Fanny) Dudley Cohen (née Miller) in 1896 and Florence Mary Maud McCarron around 1914. From 1899 to 1921 he served on Melbourne City Council, and was Lord Mayor from 1906 to 1908, in which year he was knighted. In 1907 he was elected to the Victorian Legislative Assembly for East Melbourne. He lost his seat in 1911, but in 1919 returned to Parliament for Melbourne Province in the Victorian Legislative Council. Weedon died in Darlinghurst in Sydney in 1921 and was buried in Melbourne

References

1859 births
1921 deaths
Nationalist Party of Australia members of the Parliament of Victoria
Members of the Victorian Legislative Assembly
Members of the Victorian Legislative Council
Australian Knights Bachelor
Mayors and Lord Mayors of Melbourne